Agnes Hohenstaufen  (?-1151), was a Grand Princess of the Kiev by marriage to Iziaslav II of Kiev, Grand Prince of Kiev (r. 1146–1149 and 1151–1154).

Issue
 Mstislav II of Kiev
 Yaroslav II of Kiev
 Yaropolk, Prince of Shumsk
 Vasylko (1151–1182), prince of Shumsk

References

Year of birth unknown
Date of death unknown
Kievan Rus' princesses
1151 deaths
12th-century Rus' women